Sussex is a village in Waukesha County, Wisconsin, United States, about  northwest of Milwaukee and  north of Waukesha. The population was 11,487 at the 2020 census. It is part of the Milwaukee metropolitan area.

History
It was founded in 1843 by George Elliott, a bricklayer from Beckley, East Sussex, and Richard Cooling, a blacksmith from Dorset.

Geography
The Bugline Trail, a paved 16-mile rail trail, runs directly through the village.

Demographics

2010 census
As of the census of 2010, there were 10,518 people, 4,039 households, and 2,932 families living in the village. The racial makeup of the village was 95.2% White, 0.8% African American, 0.3% Native American, 2.1% Asian, 0.5% from other races, and 1.1% from two or more races. Hispanic or Latino of any race were 2.4% of the population.

There were 4,039 households, of which 39.8% had children under the age of 18 living with them, 60.1% were married couples living together, 9.0% had a female householder with no husband present, 3.4% had a male householder with no wife present, and 27.4% were non-families. 22.5% of all households were made up of individuals, and 7.9% had someone living alone who was 65 years of age or older. The average household size was 2.60 and the average family size was 3.09.

The median age in the village was 37.5 years. 28.3% of residents were under the age of 18; 6.6% were between the ages of 18 and 24; 28.1% were from 25 to 44; 27.3% were from 45 to 64; and 9.6% were 65 years of age or older. The gender makeup of the village was 49.4% male and 50.6% female.

2000 census
As of the census of 2000, there were 8,828 people, 3,310 households, and 2,502 families living in the village. The population density was 1,464.0 people per square mile (565.3/km2). There were 3,441 housing units at an average density of 570.6 per square mile (220.3/km2). The racial makeup of the village was 96.98% White, 0.75% African American, 0.18% Native American, 0.80% Asian, 0.05% Pacific Islander, 0.36% from other races, and 0.88% from two or more races. Hispanic or Latino of any race were 1.67% of the population.

There were 3,310 households, out of which 41.9% had children under the age of 18 living with them, 63.1% were married couples living together, 9.5% had a female householder with no husband present, and 24.4% were non-families. 19.5% of all households were made up of individuals, and 7.6% had someone living alone who was 65 years of age or older. The average household size was 2.67 and the average family size was 3.09.

In the village, the population was spread out, with 29.3% under the age of 18, 6.9% from 18 to 24, 36.3% from 25 to 44, 19.2% from 45 to 64, and 8.3% who were 65 years of age or older. The median age was 34 years. For every 100 females, there were 96.0 males. For every 100 females age 18 and over, there were 93.8 males.

The median income for a household in the village was $60,283, and the median income for a family was $65,702. Males had a median income of $46,319 versus $30,182 for females. The per capita income for the village was $23,913. About 3.5% of families and 3.7% of the population were below the poverty line, including 5.0% of those under age 18 and 4.9% of those age 65 or over.

Economy
The headquarters of Quad/Graphics is located in Sussex. Kraft Foods had operated a Tombstone and DiGiorno pizza manufacturing plant in the village. The plant, which employed 330 employees, closed in March 2007.

Education
Sussex is served by the Hamilton School District, which operates a preschool, four elementary schools, an intermediate school (5th and 6th grade), a middle school (7th and 8th), and a high school in the Sussex area.

Sussex is home to the Pauline Haass Public Library, a member library of the Bridges Library System. The Sussex-Lisbon Area Historium is in the Sussex Civic Center.

Notable people 

 William H. Edwards, multi-term state legislator from Sussex
 Kellyn Taylor, long distance runner, native of Sussex

Media

 Sussex Sun – weekly newspaper
 WSJP 1640 AM – Relevant Radio

References

External links
 Village of Sussex

Villages in Waukesha County, Wisconsin
Villages in Wisconsin
Populated places established in 1843
1843 establishments in Wisconsin Territory